Booth Western Art Museum, located in Cartersville, Georgia, is a museum dedicated to the Western United States. It is one of only two museums of its kind in the Southeastern United States, the other being the James Museum of Western and Wildlife Art in St. Petersburg, FL.

A  expansion, complete in October 2009, doubled the Museum’s exhibition space allowing for even more Western artwork to be displayed. However, the core of the collection is built around living artists of traditional Western imagery such as Howard Terpning, Ken Riley, and G. Harvey, as well as more contemporary artists like Ed Mell, Thom Ross, Donna Howell-Sickles, Kim Wiggins and others.

Awards and affiliations 
Became a Smithsonian Institution Affiliate in August 2006.
Invited to and accepted the invitation to join the Museums West Consortium   in January 2008.
Nominated for a National Medal for Museum and Library Service by Congressman Phil Gingrey (January 2008).
Received an Honorable Mention at the Georgia Association of Museums and Galleries  2011 Annual Conference for the exhibit, Ansel Adams: A Legacy.

References

External links 

 Official website of Booth Western Art Museum
 Visit Cartersville Website
 pba.org Public Broadcasting Atlanta, This is Atlanta with Alicia Steele, 2009
 exploregeorgia.org Official Georgia Tourism Website
 ptsnorth.com Points North Magazine, March 2009

Art museums and galleries in Georgia (U.S. state)
Smithsonian Institution affiliates
Culture of the Western United States
Museums in Bartow County, Georgia
American West museums
Museums of American art
Art museums established in 2003
2003 establishments in Georgia (U.S. state)